The 1961 World Chess Championship was played between former champion Mikhail Botvinnik and champion Mikhail Tal in Moscow from March 15 to May 13, 1961. Tal had unseated Botvinnik in the 1960 match; thus, Botvinnik was entitled to this rematch the next year. Tal was considered a strong favourite due to his heavy win the previous year, and being 25 years younger.

Botvinnik won convincingly, by a 13–8 margin, regaining the world title. Although Tal suffered kidney illness in 1962, there was no hint of it at the time, and commentators put the victory down to Botvinnik playing a superior strategy, and being able to combat Tal's attacking style. However, in 2002, Yuri Averbakh revealed that Tal was having health issues, and his doctors in Riga advised that he should postpone the match for health reasons. When Botvinnik would agree to a postponement only if Tal was certified unfit by Moscow doctors, Tal decided to play, thinking he would win anyway.

The win made Botvinnik the first (and only) person to have three separate reigns as World Champion. At 49 years of age, it also makes him (as of 2021) the oldest player since 1891 to win a World Championship match.

Results
The match was played as best of 24 games. If it ended 12–12, Tal, the title holder, would retain the Championship.

See also
 World Chess Championship 1960

References

External links
1961 World Chess Championship at the Internet Archive record of Graeme Cree's Chess Pages

1961
1961 in Russia
1961 in Soviet sport
Chess in the Soviet Union
1961 in Moscow